Pehr Louis Sparre af Söfdeborg (3 August 1863 – 26 October 1964) was a Swedish painter, designer and draughtsman, most noted for his early work in the Finnish national romanticism and jugend styles. He also competed in the individual and team épée fencing events at the 1912 Summer Olympics.

Biography
Born in Gravellona Lomellina, Italy. He was the son of  Pehr Ambjörn Sparre af Söfdeborg (1828–1921) and Teresita Adèle Josefa Gaetana Barbavara (1844–1867). His father had served as head of the banknote printing company for the Sveriges Riksbank. He spent his early childhood with the mother at Villa Teresita in Gravellona  while his father was often on business trips. After having suffered an accident, her mother died when he was four years old. He then moved with his father in Paris prior to being sent to Sweden for school studies. He attended the Royal Swedish Academy of Fine Arts before relocating to Paris.

Sparre was a student at Académie Julian in Paris from 1887 until 1890. He studied with Akseli Gallen-Kallela, Eero Järnefelt and Emil Wikström and took part in painting trips in Karelia with Kallela and Wikström. Sparre is often mentioned as a founder of the Karelianism movement, along with Akseli Gallen-Kallela. He moved to Finland in 1889, living there for almost two decades. In 1893, Sparre married Eva Mannerheim (1870–1958), an artist and the sister of Carl Gustaf Emil Mannerheim.

In 1891, two of his works were exhibited at the Paris Salon. After the mid-1890s, Sparre reduced his work as a painter and instead worked on developing the industrial art and graphics industry in Finland. In 1897, he founded the Iris furniture and ceramics factory in Porvoo. Impressed by the pottery of the English-Belgian ceramist and painter Alfred William Finch, Sparre invited him to manage the ceramics department. By the request of his friend, Karl Emil Ståhlberg, Sparre also worked as the director for the first Finnish fictional film, the 20-minute-long Salaviinanpolttajat in 1907.

In 1908, Sparre moved back to Sweden and continued his painting career, concentrating on portraiture and painting landscapes. By the time of his death in 1964 in Stockholm, aged 101, Sparre had completed over 500 portraits.

References

External links
Louis Sparre biography at the Amos Anderson art museum

1863 births
1964 deaths
Swedish centenarians
19th-century Swedish nobility
19th-century Swedish painters
Swedish male painters
20th-century Swedish painters
Swedish male épée fencers
Olympic fencers of Sweden
Fencers at the 1912 Summer Olympics
Swedish expatriates in Finland
Men centenarians
19th-century Swedish male artists
20th-century Swedish male artists